The FIM Tobet Speedway World Cup Race-Off was the third meeting of the 2009 Speedway World Cup tournament. It took place on 16 July 2009 in the Alfred Smoczyk Stadium in Leszno, Poland.

The Race-off was won by Australian team (51 points). Australia and Sweden (39 pts) qualifying to Saturday's World Cup Final at Leszno also. Third Great Britain (35 pts) and fourth Denmark (34 pts) was knocked out of the competition.

Results

Heat details

Heat after heat 
 Watt, Hougaard, Harris, Lindbäck
 Richardson, Klindt, Shields, Ruud
 Adams, Lindgren, Iversen, Bridger (E3)
 Holder, Davidsson, Andersen, King
 Crump, Jonsson, Bjerre, Woffinden
 Crump, Lindgren, Hougaard, King
 Watt, Woffinden, Klindt, Davidsson
 Harris, Jonsson, Shields, Iversen
 Richardson, Adams, Lindbäck, Andersen
 Bjerre, Holder, Ruud, Bridger (T) Bridger excluded after touching the tapes - race restarted.
 Richardson (6 pts), Shields, Davidsson, Hougaard
 Jonsson, Adams, King, Klindt
 Lindbäck, Woffinden, Iversen, Holder (Fx)
 Crump, Harris, Ruud, Andersen
 Bjerre, Watt, Richardson, Lindgren
 Bjerre (6 pts), Woffinden, Adams, Ruud
 Holder, Lindgren, Harris, Klindt
 Crump, Richardson, Iversen, Davidsson
 Jonsson, Hougaard, Watt, Bridger
 Bjerre, Harris, Lindbäck, Shields
 Holder, Richardson, Hougaard, Jonsson
 Lindbäck, Crump, Andersen, WoffindenResults was canceled, because Andersen and Woffinden was started from wrong gate.  Lindbäck, Crump, Woffinden, Andersen
 Jonsson (6 pts), Watt, Iversen, King
 Klindt, Lindgren, Woffinden, Shields (F3) Crash on final lap - Shields injured
 Adams, Lindbäck, Bjerre, Harris

See also 
 2009 Speedway World Cup
 motorcycle speedway

References 

R
Speedway